Palmer Kelley (birth unknown – death unknown) was an American Negro league pitcher in 1916 and 1917.

Kelley made his Negro leagues debut in 1916 with the Chicago Giants, and played his final season the following year with the Chicago Union Giants.

References

External links
  and Seamheads

Year of birth missing
Year of death missing
Place of birth missing
Place of death missing
Chicago Giants players
Baseball pitchers